Conus magnificus, common name the "magnificent cone", is a species of predatory sea snail, a marine gastropod mollusk in the family Conidae, the cone snails, cone shells or cones.

The subspecies Conus magnificus macilentus Lauer, 1989is a synonym of Conus episcopatus da Motta, 1982

Distribution
This is a marine Indo-Pacific species, excluding Hawaii; also off Australia (Queensland).
Common in Vietnam and Southeast Asia, 
but rare in French Polynesia and in the Northern Red Sea.

Shell description
The size of the shell varies between 55 mm and 92 mm. The shell is intricately marked with a white ground color overlaid with brown to red brown.

References

 Reeve, L.A. 1843. Monograph of the genus Conus. pls 1-39 in Reeve, L.A. (ed.). Conchologica Iconica. London : L. Reeve & Co. Vol. 1.
 Hinton, A. 1972. Shells of New Guinea and the Central Indo-Pacific. Milton : Jacaranda Press xviii 94 pp.
 Salvat, B. & Rives, C. 1975. Coquillages de Polynésie. Tahiti : Papéete Les editions du pacifique, pp. 1–391.
 Cernohorsky, W.O. 1978. Tropical Pacific Marine Shells. Sydney : Pacific Publications 352 pp., 68 pls.
 Wilson, B. 1994. Australian Marine Shells. Prosobranch Gastropods. Kallaroo, WA : Odyssey Publishing Vol. 2 370 pp.
 Röckel, D., Korn, W. & Kohn, A.J. 1995. Manual of the Living Conidae. Volume 1: Indo-Pacific Region. Wiesbaden : Hemmen 517 pp.
 Tucker J.K. & Tenorio M.J. (2009) Systematic classification of Recent and fossil conoidean gastropods. Hackenheim: Conchbooks. 296 pp.
 Puillandre N., Duda T.F., Meyer C., Olivera B.M. & Bouchet P. (2015). One, four or 100 genera? A new classification of the cone snails. Journal of Molluscan Studies. 81: 1-23

External links 
 Conus magnificus - A picture of the shell of this species.
 Cone Shells - Knights of the Sea
 

magnificus
Molluscs of the Indian Ocean
Molluscs of the Pacific Ocean
Gastropods described in 1843
Taxa named by Lovell Augustus Reeve